= Kereta api =

Kereta api may refer to:

- Kereta Api Indonesia (KAI), the state railway operator in Indonesia
- Keretapi Tanah Melayu (KTM), a major railway operator in Peninsular Malaysia
